Aruattus is a monotypic genus of Indonesian jumping spiders containing the single species, Aruattus agostii. It was first described by D. V. Logunov & G. N. Azarkina in 2008, and is only found in Indonesia. The name is a combination of the Aru Islands, and attus, a prefix often used for salticid genera , meaning "jumper". The species is named after its collector, D. Agosti.

References

Monotypic Salticidae genera
Salticidae
Spiders of Indonesia